Bacteriophage f2 is an icosahedral, positive-sense single-stranded RNA virus that infects the bacterium Escherichia coli.  It is closely related to bacteriophage MS2 and assigned to the same species.

History
f2 was the first RNA-containing bacteriophage to be isolated, reported in 1961.  Tim Loeb and Norton Zinder searched for and discovered two phages in filtered samples of raw New York City sewage that grew on male (F+) but not female (F−) E. coli.  The first phage was f1, which produced cloudy plaques; the second phage was f2, which produced clear plaques.

References

Bacteriophages